Bernard Farjat (born 7 September 1945) is a French gymnast. He competed in eight events at the 1972 Summer Olympics.

References

1945 births
Living people
French male artistic gymnasts
Olympic gymnasts of France
Gymnasts at the 1972 Summer Olympics
Place of birth missing (living people)
20th-century French people